Jozef Timmerman (30 October 1941 – 10 March 2018) was a Belgian racing cyclist. He rode in the 1964 Tour de France.

References

1941 births
2018 deaths
Belgian male cyclists
Place of birth missing